Aleksander Kaczorowski (born 29 May 1969 in Żyrardów) is a Polish bohemist, journalist, editor, writer and translator.

Life 
Kaczorowski has been studying at the Institute of Sociology of the University of Warsaw. In 1998, he graduated from Czech studies at the University of Warsaw.

Until 2002, he worked as a head of section for Gazeta Wyborcza, the biggest Polish newspaper. Later, he was deputy editor-in-chief of Newsweek Polska and Forum biweekly. Since 2012, he is editor-in-chief of Aspen Review Central Europe quarterly. He lectures at the University of Warsaw Institute of Western and Southern Slavic Studies.

He authored novels: Praskie łowy (Hunting in Prague) and collections of essays Praski elementarz (The Prague Reader), Ballada o kapciach (The Ballad of Slippers), as well as interviews Europa z płaskostopiem (Europe's Flat Feet). He wrote also biographies of Václav Havel Havel. Zemsta bezsilnych (Havel. The Revenge of the Powerless), Bohumil Hrabal Gra w życie (Playing at Life), and Ota Pavel Ota Pavel: pod powierzchnią (Ota Pavel: Beneath the Surface). Kaczorowski has translated books of such Czech authors as Bohumil Hrabal, Egon Bondy, and Josef Škvorecký, among others. He is member of Polish Writers' Association.

In 2015, Kaczorowski was nominated for Teresa Torańska Prize of Newsweek for his book on Havel. That year he was named by European Solidarity Centre and College of Eastern Europe the Ambassador of New Europe. He won Václav Burian Prize for cultural contribution to the Central European dialogue (2016). In 2019, he was awarded Upper Silesian Literary Award "Juliusz" and nominated for Nike Literary Award for the book about Ota Pavel.

Works 
Books

 Praskie łowy, Warszawa: Świat Książki, 2007, .
 Praski elementarz, Wołowiec: Czarne 2001, 2012, .
 Gra w życie. Opowieść o Bohumilu Hrabalu, Wołowiec: Czarne 2004, .
 Életjáték – Történet Bohumil Hrabalról, Budapest: Európa Könyvkiadó, 2006, .
 Il gioco della vita. La storia di Bohumil Hrabal, Rome: Edizioni E/O 2007, .
 Europa z płaskostopiem, Wołowiec: Czarne 2006, .
 Ballada o kapciach, Wołowiec: Czarne 2012, .
 Havel. Zemsta bezsilnych, Wołowiec: Czarne 2014, .
 Hrabal. Słodka apokalipsa, Wołowiec: Czarne 2016, .
 Ota Pavel: pod powierzchnią, Wołowiec: Czarne 2018, .
 Czechy. To nevymyslíš, Warszawa: Muza 2022, .

Translations

 Egon Bondy, Noga świętego Patryka, Izabelin: Świat Literacki 1995, .
 Bohumil Hrabal, Czuły barbarzyńca, Izabelin: Świat Literacki 1997, .
 Josef Škvorecký, Przypadki niefortunnego saksofonisty tenorowego, Izabelin: Świat Literacki, 1999, .
 László Szigeti, Drybling Hidegkutiego, czyli rozmowy z Hrabalem, Izabelin: Świat Literacki, 2002, .
 Bohumil Hrabal, Piękna rupieciarnia, Wołowiec: Czarne, 2006,  (with Jan Stachowski).
 Helga Weissová, Dziennik Helgi: świadectwo dziewczynki o życiu w obozach koncentracyjnych, Kraków: Insignis Media, 2013, .
 Josef Pazderka (ed.), Inwazja na Czechosłowację 1968. Perspektywa rosyjska, Instytut Pamięci Narodowej 2015, .
 Jiří Pelán, Hrabal w lustrze krytyki, [in:] W poszukiwaniu przerw w zabudowie. W stulecie urodzin Bohumila Hrabala, (ed. J. Goszczyńska), Warszawa 2015.
 Jakub Češka, Nic, tylko strach, czyli ironiczna spowiedź, [in:] W poszukiwaniu przerw w zabudowie. W stulecie urodzin Bohumila Hrabala, (ed. J. Goszczyńska), Warszawa 2015.

References 

1969 births
21st-century Polish male writers
21st-century Polish non-fiction writers
Polish male non-fiction writers
21st-century Polish novelists
Czech-Polish translators
Living people
People from Żyrardów
Polish essayists
Male essayists
Polish opinion journalists
Polish philologists
University of Warsaw alumni
Academic staff of the University of Warsaw
21st-century translators